Joseph Ham (born 20 June 1991) is a Scottish professional boxer. As an amateur, he competed at the 2013 World Championships, as well as two European Championships and two Commonwealth Games.

Early years
Born and raised in the Gorbals, Ham began boxing at the age of 12 as a way to get fit and lose weight, initially joining Dennistoun McNair ABC. He followed the advice of his father, also named Joseph, who was a former boxer himself. Just a year later he won the Scottish national championship, his first at the youth level. After turning 18 he started training at Hayfield ABC in the Gorbals.

Ham won a total of ten Scottish championships, and was a two-time British champion as well. Following his round of 16 loss to Sakaria Lukas at the 2010 Commonwealth Games, he collapsed in his training room and required medical assistance. The following year he won a gold medal at the 2011 GB Amateur Boxing Championships in London, defeating 2010 Commonwealth gold medallist Sean McGoldrick in the final. In March 2014 he won his fifth consecutive Scottish national title at the senior level, securing his spot at the 2014 Commonwealth Games in his hometown. At the Games, Ham defeated Nadir Nadir of Pakistan in the round of 16 before getting knocked out in the quarterfinals by longtime rival Qais Ashfaq.

Amateur results

Incomplete for early years
2007 British Cadet (Junior) Championships in Edinburgh, Scotland (flyweight - 1991 division)
 Defeated Nico Morrison (Wales) 7–6
 Lost to Gamal Yafai (England) 4–9 
2007 European Union Cadet (Junior) Championships in Porto Torres, Italy (flyweight)
 Lost to Mehmet Topcakan (Turkey) 7–25
2008 Franko Blagonic Junior Memorial in Rijeka, Croatia (bantamweight)
 Defeated Elvis Dodaj (Croatia) 29–13
 Lost to Magomed Kurbanov (Russia) WO 
2008 British Youth Championships in Edinburgh, Scotland (flyweight - 1991 division)
 Lost to James Dickens (England) 5–8
2008 Brandenburg Junior Cup in Frankfurt an der Oder, Germany (flyweight)
 Defeated Zsolt Dobradi (Hungary) RSCO3
 Lost to Oualid Belaouara (France) 11–27
2009 Pyynikki Tournament in Tampere, Finland (bantamweight - youth division)
 Defeated Miikka Koskela (Finland) 5–0
 Defeated Romans Belousovs (Latvia) RSC3
 Defeated Allan Cameron (Scotland) WO 
2009 Franko Blagonic Youth Memorial in Rijeka, Croatia (bantamweight)
 Defeated Damjan Herljevic (Croatia) AB3
 Defeated Edgar Walth (Germany) 22–10 
2009 Presidents Cup (youth) in Grudziądz, Poland (bantamweight)
 Lost to Kamil Łaszczyk (Poland) 3–9
2009 Mostar International Youth Tournament in Mostar, Bosnia and Herzegovina (bantamweight)
 Defeated Zlatko Catic (Bosnia and Herzegovina) RSC2
 Lost to Elian Dimitrov (Bulgaria) 12–18 
2009 British Youth Championships in Liverpool, England (bantamweight - 1991 division)
 Defeated Peter Cope (England) 9–6
 Defeated Sean McGoldrick (Wales) 5–2 
2009 European Youth Championships in Szczecin, Poland (bantamweight)
 Defeated Pavlo Ishchenko (Ukraine) 6–5
 Lost to Elvin Isayev (Azerbaijan) 0–1
2009 Tammer Tournament in Tamprere, Finland (featherweight)
 Defeated Wael Al-Khaghani (Finland) RSC2
 Defeated Brahim Zendaoui (France) 9–2
 Lost to Martin Ward (England) 4–9 
2009 Golden Gong in Skopje, Macedonia (bantamweight)
 Defeated Elian Dimitrov (Bulgaria) 
2010 Scottish National Championships in Aberdeen/Coatbridge, Scotland (bantamweight)
 Defeated Danny Singh WO
 Defeated John Thomson 4–1 
2010 Gee-Bee Tournament in Helsinki, Finland (bantamweight)
 Lost to Zafar Parpiev (Russia) 4–12
2010 European Championships in Moscow, Russia (bantamweight)
 Lost to Matti Koota (Finland) 2–9

2010 Commonwealth Games in New Delhi, India (bantamweight)
 Lost to Sakaria Lukas (Namibia) 11–14
2011 Scottish National Championships in Coatbridge, Scotland (bantamweight)
 Defeated Stephen Tiffney 6–5
 Defeated David Dickson 10–3 
2011 Beogradski Pobednik in Belgrade, Serbia (bantamweight)
 Lost to Shiva Thapa (India) 1–5
2011 Great Britain Championships in London, England (bantamweight)
 Defeated Alimaan Hussain (England) 14–8
 Defeated Sean McGoldrick (Wales) 25–14 
2011 Tammer Tournament in Tampere, Finland (bantamweight)
 Lost to Qais Ashfaq (England) 10–12 
2012 Scottish National Championships in Edinburgh/Inverurie, Scotland (bantamweight)
 Defeated David Dickson 15–10
 Defeated Graeme Munro RSC2 
2012 Olympic Gloves Tournament in Tallinn, Estonia (bantamweight)
 Defeated Alexandr Bykadorov (Russia) 7–6
 Lost to Sean McGoldrick (Wales) 2–6 
2012 Great Britain Championships in London, England (bantamweight)
 Lost to Sean McGoldrick (Wales) 14–17 
2012 Tammer Tournament in Tampere, Finland (bantamweight)
 Lost to Michael Nevin (Ireland) 8–18
2013 Scottish National Championships in Edinburgh, Scotland (bantamweight)
 Defeated Scott McCormack 12–5
 Defeated Stephen Tiffney 12–11
 Defeated Kevin Skey 18–11 
2013 Beogradski Pobednik in Belgrade, Serbia (bantamweight)
 Lost to Razvan Andreiana (Romania) 7–10
2013 Hakija Turajlic Memorial in Sarajevo, Bosnia and Herzegovina (bantamweight)
 Defeated Othman Arbabi (Qatar) TKO1
 Defeated David Cufaj (Bosnia and Herzegovina) RSC2 
2013 European Championships in Minsk, Belarus (bantamweight)
 Defeated Mateusz Mazik (Poland) 2–1
 Lost to Vladimir Nikitin (Russia) 0–3
2013 World Championships in Almaty, Kazakhstan (bantamweight)
 Defeated Yakub Meredov (Turkmenistan) 3–0
 Lost to Mykola Butsenko (Ukraine) 0–3
2013 Tammer Tournament in Tampere, Finland (bantamweight)
 Lost to Qais Ashfaq (England) 0–3
2014 Scottish National Championships in Glasgow, Scotland (bantamweight)
 Defeated David Dickson 2–1
 Defeated Brandon Singh PTS 
2014 Commonwealth Games in Glasgow, Scotland (bantamweight)
 Defeated Nadir Nadir (Pakistan) 3–0
 Lost to Qais Ashfaq (England) 0–3

Professional career
Ham made his professional debut on 14 December 2014, defeating journeyman Dato Kvaratskhelia by first-round knockout (KO) at the Thistle Hotel in Glasgow. He won the vacant Scottish Area super-bantamweight title on 15 April 2017, beating Scott McCormack on points on the Ricky Burns–Julius Indongo undercard for his first title. His employer, Glasgow-based construction firm City Building, gave him seven weeks off to train in preparation for the fight. He suffered his first defeat as a professional on 30 June 2018, losing to southpaw Tyrone McCullagh by unanimous decision (UD) in Belfast with the vacant Celtic super-bantamweight title on the line. After two more victories back home, Ham travelled to Manchester to challenge for the vacant WBA Continental super-bantamweight title on 2 November 2019 against Qais Ashfaq, who had knocked him out of the 2014 Commonwealth Games quarterfinals. In their rematch five years later, an accidental headclash in the sixth round caused the referee to halt the bout and go to the judges, who awarded Ashfaq the unanimous technical decision victory with scores of 70–63, 70–64 and 69–64.

In September 2020 it was announced that Ham had signed with MTK Global.

Professional boxing record

References

External links
 

Living people
1991 births
Scottish male boxers
Super-bantamweight boxers
Boxers at the 2010 Commonwealth Games
Boxers at the 2014 Commonwealth Games
Commonwealth Games competitors for Scotland
Boxers from Glasgow